Campo de Villavidel (Leonese: Campu de Villavidel) is a municipality located in the province of León, Castile and León, Spain. According to the 2010 census (INE), the municipality has a population of 227 inhabitants.

References

Municipalities in the Province of León